The 2011 FIBA Under-19 World Championship for Women was hosted by Chile from July 21 to July 31, 2011. The draw for the Championship took place on March 18, 2011 in Puerto Montt. Teams played a round robin schedule, with the top four teams of the eighth-final four advancing to the knockout stage.

Nigeria did not turn up for the tournament, so the championship just consisted of 15 teams.

Venues
Below is a list of the venues which were used to host games during the 2011 FIBA Under-19 World Championship for Women.

Group stage
Times given below are in Chile Standard Time (UTC−4).

Group A

Group B

Group C
Nigeria withdrew from the tournament, the other teams of the group were given a 20–0 win.

Group D

Eighth-final round

Group E

Group F

Knockout stage

Bracket

5th place bracket

9th place bracket

13th place bracket

Quarterfinals

Classification 13–16

Classification 9–12

Classification 5–8

Semifinals

Fifteenth place game

Thirteenth place game

Eleventh place game

Ninth place game

Seventh place game

Fifth place game

Third place game

Final

Statistical leaders

Points

Rebounds

Assists

Blocks

Steals

Final standings

Awards

All-Tournament Team
  Damiris Dantas
  Rui Machida
  Ariel Massengale
  Breanna Stewart
  Astou Ndour

References

External links 
 FIBA Under-19 World Championship for Women 2011

2011
2011 in women's basketball
Bask
International women's basketball competitions hosted by Chile
2011 in youth sport